Arnold D. Harvey (born 1947) is an English historian, novelist and hoaxer. He originated a hoax claiming that Charles Dickens met Fyodor Dostoyevsky, and has published work under a variety of other names, including Stephanie Harvey, Stephen Harvey, Graham Headley, Trevor McGovern, John Schellenberger, Leo Bellingham, Michael Lindsay, Ludovico Parra, and Janis Blodnieks.

Early life and education 
Born in and brought up in Colchester, A. D. Harvey read Modern History under Sir Keith Thomas at St John's College, Oxford, and obtained his Ph.D. in History at Cambridge only six years after sitting his G.C.E. A-levels, being a member of University College, now Wolfson College.

In a letter to The Times Literary Supplement, he stated that "practically everyone [he] met while an undergraduate 1966–69" was "bored, frustrated and above all disillusioned by an Oxford that was so much more mundane than their school daydreams". His first novel, Oxford: The Novel, published in 1981 under the pseudonym "Leo Bellingham" by his own imprint, Nold Jonson Books, fictionalises his time as an undergraduate. It is peppered with erotically charged scenes and attacks on the Oxford student left.

Academic career 
Harvey has taught at the universities of Cambridge, Salerno, La Réunion and Leipzig. He has written several academic monographs dealing with different aspects of English cultural, social and military history. Kathryn Hughes called him "a master of the concrete, the adroit displayer of the precious scrap of hard fact". At times his works have been described by reviewers as somewhat encyclopaedic and lacking in analysis, though Andrew Roberts in The Times wrote of his "academically immaculate analyses". He was briefly editor of the journal Salisbury Review. He has also contributed to History Today and BBC History Magazine on subjects including Napoleon, the boroughs of London, Gustav III of Sweden, Engelbert Dollfuss, Churchill on Rollerskates and the Stuka divebomber. He has made contributions to specialist journals on aspects of air warfare.

Harvey has published under many pseudonyms and in 2013 he was identified as the author of a 2002 article attributed to a "Stephanie Harvey" falsely claiming that Charles Dickens and Fyodor Dostoevsky met in 1862. The account of this meeting and the supposed insight into Dickens's character and literary motivations revealed in a wholly fictitious letter by Dostoevsky was subsequently quoted in a number of scholarly articles and books, including major biographies of Dickens. The hoax, along with Harvey's record of pseudonymous publications and falsified citations, was exposed in April 2013 in an article in the Times Literary Supplement by Eric Naiman, Professor of Comparative Literature & Department Chair of Slavic Languages and Literatures at University of California, Berkeley.

Literary career 

Besides Oxford: the Novel, Harvey has published another novel, Warriors of the Rainbow, a work of science fiction about a reanimated woman and her lover, set in a world controlled by a shadowy cadre of whales. It was described by The Guardian as "weirdly compelling" and by The Independent as "free flowing and poetic". He is also a published poet (Sonnets 2006) and a prolific letter writer to the literary journals of the United Kingdom.

Select bibliography 
 Britain in the Early Nineteenth Century (1978)
 English Poetry in a Changing Society, 1780–1825 (1980)
 Mind-Sprung (1981)
 Oxford: The Novel (1981)
 Literature into History (1988)
 Collision of Empires: Britain in Three World Wars, 1793–1945 (1992, revised edition 1994)
 Sex in Georgian England: Attitudes and Prejudices from the 1720s to the 1820s (1994. revised edition 2001)
 A Muse of Fire: Literature, Art and War (1998)
 Warriors of the Rainbow (2000)
 Arnhem (2001)
 Body Politic: Political Metaphor and Political Violence (2007)
 Testament of War: Literature, Art and the First World War (2018)
 Side Stories (2020)

References 

1947 births
Living people
British writers
Alumni of St John's College, Oxford
British historians
Alumni of Wolfson College, Cambridge
Academics of the University of Cambridge
Academic staff of the University of Salerno
Academic staff of Leipzig University
Hoaxers